Howard Joseph Carroll (August 5, 1902 – March 21, 1960) was an American prelate of the Roman Catholic Church who served as the fourth bishop of the Diocese of Altoona in Pennsylvania from 1958 to 1960.

Biography

Early life 
Howard Carroll was born on August 5, 1902 in Pittsburgh, Pennsylvania.  He attended Duquesne University from 1920 to 1921. He then studied at St. Vincent College in Latrobe, from where he obtained a Bachelor of Arts degree and a Licentiate of Philosophy. In 1923, Carroll entered the University of Fribourg in Fribourg, Switzerland, earning a Doctor of Sacred Theology degree in 1928.

Priesthood 
Carroll was ordained to the priesthood on April 2, 1927. Following his return to Pennsylvania in 1928, he served as a curate at Sacred Heart Parish in Pittsburgh until 1938, when he became assistant general-secretary of the National Catholic Welfare Council (NCWC). He was named a papal chamberlain in 1942 and a domestic prelate in 1945. He served as general-secretary of NCWC from 1944 to 1957.

Bishop of Altoona 
On December 5, 1957, Carroll was appointed bishop of the Diocese of Altoona by Pope Pius XII. He received his episcopal consecration on January 2, 1958, from Archbishop Amleto Cicognani, assisted by Bishops John Dearden and Coleman Carroll (his brother). 

Howard Carroll died on March 21, 1960 at age 57.

References

1902 births
1960 deaths
Duquesne University alumni
Saint Vincent College alumni
Religious leaders from Pittsburgh
20th-century Roman Catholic bishops in the United States